Jaan Mets (2 January 1891 Vana-Kariste Parish, Pärnu County – 18 September 1969 Uppsala, Sweden) was an Estonian politician. He was a member of Estonian Constituent Assembly.

References

1891 births
1969 deaths
Members of the Estonian Constituent Assembly